Mercês can refer to:

 Mercês (Minas Gerais), a place in Brazil
 Mercês (Lisbon), a place in Portugal
 Merces (Goa), a locality besides Panaji, Tiswadi in Goa, India
 Merces (Vasai), a locality besides Mumbai(Bombay), Thane in Maharashtra, India